Jana Sena or Jana Sena Party (JSP) (People's Army Party) is an Indian Regional political party based in Andhra Pradesh and Telangana, India. It was founded by Tollywood actor and politician Pawan Kalyan on 14 March 2014. Jana Sena means "People's Army" in Telugu.

Formation
On 12 March 2014, Pawan Kalyan submitted the application to register the party name. Kalyan formally launched the party at the HITEC City business district in Madhapur, Hyderabad, on 14 March with a massive meeting. This was followed by another public gathering and meeting in Vizag where he launched his book Ism. The party was approved by the Election Commission on 11 December 2014.

Ideology
The main goal of Jana Sena is to question any type of corruption in government functioning and organizations and to protect basic rights of people. JSP follows 7 basic ideals promoted as Ideals of JanaSena (JanaSena Sidhanthalu in Telugu):
Social consciousness without caste 
Politics without religious discrimination
Reverence for linguistic diversity
Protection of our traditions and culture
Nationalism without neglecting regional aspirations
Relentless fight against corruption
Progress that preserves the environment
However, there has been confusion around Jana Sena Party's political philosophy. Despite likening himself to Che Guevara and choosing a red star as his party’s symbol, Pawan Kalyan supported BJP in 2014 elections. Later, he lashed out at BJP government at the Centre for not granting Special Category Status to Andhra Pradesh. Again, Jana Sena Party officially entered into an alliance with BJP in January 2020.

Elections

2014 elections
JanaSena supported BJP and TDP in 2014 general and assembly elections. JSP chief Pawan Kalyan campaigned in Andhra Pradesh, Telangana and Karnataka and addressed public along with Narendra Modi and N. Chandrababu Naidu who later won the elections and became Prime Minister of India and Chief Minister of AP respectively. He opposed Congress rule stating the slogan Congress Hatao Desh Bachao. His rallies drew what the Deccan-Journal called "huge crowds" in Andhra Pradesh and Telangana. Pawan Kalyan was invited to Parliament Central Hall to attend NDA meeting. He even attended swearing-in ceremony of Chandrababu Naidu.

Post 2014 elections
It was announced in November 2016 that the first office of the Jana Sena Party (JSP) would be set up at Anantapur in the following year and it would contest the 2019 general election. Pawan Kalyan is the one who exposed Uddanam kidney issue in Srikakulam district. He requested doctors from Harvard University to take part in a research on kidney issue in this region. He later conducted meeting in Visakhapatnam with Harvard doctors and local scientists who are working on the kidney problems in Uddanam. He met Chandrababu Naidu to explain about situation in Uddanam with his team and as a result the government has set up dialysis center in the region.

On 21 February 2017, Kalyan announced that he would launch a website on 14 March to mark the party's anniversary and invite recommendations for the party manifesto in the 2019 general election.

2019 elections 
On 2 May 2018, the JSP announced that it would contest all 175 assembly seats in Andhra Pradesh during the 2019 assembly election. JSP formed a bloc with leftist parties (Communist Party of India and Communist Party of India (Marxist)) and Bahujan Samaj Party in Andhra Pradesh.

JSP chief Pawan Kalyan contested two seats in the election, Gajuwaka and Bhimavaram. He failed to win either seat. Rapaka Vara Prasada Rao was elected from Razole Assembly constituency. JSP managed to get 7% vote share in Andhra Pradesh.

Manifesto :
Pawan Kalyan released the party's 2019 election manifesto on 5th formation day of JSP at Rajahmundry. The party declared war on unemployment and corruption, and wished to ensure the safety of women. Other goals included:
Dokka Seethamma canteen, which provides free food for students
5,000 pension for small marginal tenant-farmers above 60 years of age and free solar pump-sets for all farmers
Arts and science college at every mandal level
10 lakh (one million rupees) free health insurance, and mobile diagnostic centers in all mandals
10,000 financial support at 25 paisa interest to small businesses
Implementation of Sachar Committee recommendations
Free education from LKG to PG
Free liquid petroleum gas cylinders for housewives
Financial support for fishermen during the non-fishing season
High court bench in Rayalaseema
Chief minister (CM) to be brought under LokAyukta
33% reservations for women in the state legislature and establishment of Mahila banks in all districts
Ten lakh (one million) jobs every year

Post 2019 Elections and BJP alliance 

Jana Sena announced that tying up with Bharatiya Janata Party in Andhra Pradesh, this decision came after Chief minister Y. S. Jagan Mohan Reddy's intention to decentralise the capital, instead of developing Amaravati.

2023 bus campaign 

Janasena President Pawan Kalyan will undertake a bus trip in AP for the upcoming 2024 elections. Pawan Kalyan named the bus arranged for the bus trip Varahi. The news became a sensation in AP politics. The color of Pawan Kalyan Varahi's bus is similar to the olive green color prescribed for the Indian Army and many party leaders are criticizing how this color is being used.

Meanwhile, Kalyan was given permission by the Telangana State Transport Department to use the bus. According to the body, The vehicle is not painted olive green but emerald green. Also, it was announced that this bus has been granted permission in the private camper van category. A registration number has also been alloted to Varahi.

Protests
Pawan Kalyan is the first leader who opposed BJP lead central government for not granting Special Category Status to Andhra Pradesh. He called Special Package as just an eye wash. He later attended a huge public gathering Seemandhrula Atma Gaurava Sabha in Kakinada on 9 Sep 2016 demanding Special Category Status. He slammed Narendra Modi, Venkaiah Naidu, Arun Jaitley and urged AP M.P's to learn Hindi to demand Special Category Status in Parliament. 4th formation day of JSP was conducted at Acharya Nagarjuna University grounds on March 14, 2018. The meeting started with cultural activities followed by party president's speech. Kalyan criticized both central and state governments in this meeting. He mainly targeted Arun Jaitley, N. Chandrababu Naidu and Nara Lokesh for their poor governance and corruption. He said "I supported the TDP and the BJP parties during the general elections held in 2014 with a hope that they would rebuild the state which had no Capital and no financial resources. But the state government has belied my hopes and the aspirations of crores of people. Why should I support these parties which have betrayed the people?" He questioned Chandrababu Naidu about his son's corruption. He said "Don't you know about your son Lokesh's corruption? Are you letting him do it despite your knowledge? if so, I'm leaving it to your wisdom. You have satisfied no one. You have lost the faith of people including mine." He went on one-day hunger strike for proper caring of patients in Uddanam in 2018.  Kalyan opposed the central government's move to privatize the Dredging Corporation of India (DCI), and the TDP government's decision on land pooling. He led a protest march to commemorate farmers who committed suicide or migrated from the drought-prone regions of Rayalaseema, and later organized a march on the historical Dowleswaram Barrage, Rajahmundry, demanding political accountability. The JSP Chief exposed the alleged unchecked mining in the reserve forest area at Vanthada Village of Prathipadu, East Godavari district. The prime objective of Jana Sena Party has been to ensure equal power to all social groups of people.

Leadership

Political Affairs Committee

Vice-President: Bongunoori Mahender Reddy
Telangana Incharge: Nemuri Shankar Goud
Political Advisor: P Ramamohan Rao (Ex-TN Chief Secretary)
Political Secretary to President: P Hari Prasad
Official Representatives: Bolisetti Satya, Kandula Durgesh (Ex-MLC), T Shivashankar
Party Affairs Committee Chairman: Sekhar Puli
IT Center: Ram Talluri
Official Spokesperson: Prof. Dr.K. Sarat Kumar
Other leaders include Naga Babu,  Kethamreddy Vinod Reddy, Sandeep Panchakarla,Siva Rama Krishna Vaka, Muttamsetti Krishna Rao, Palavalsa Yesaswini, Jivaji Rekha, Arham Khan, Pasupuleti Hari Prasad, Chennareddy Manukranth, Sujatha Panda, Pantham Nanaji, Pothina Mahesh and Shaik Riyaz.

Lok Sabha Election History

Sasana Sabha Election History

Andhra Pradesh

See also
 List of political parties in India
 Telugu Desam Party
 YSR Congress Party

References

External links

 
2014 establishments in Andhra Pradesh
Political parties established in 2014
Political parties in Andhra Pradesh
Regionalist parties in India
2014 establishments in Telangana
Political parties in Telangana